Stixwould Priory was a priory  in Lincolnshire, England, a Cistercian nunnery founded by Lucy, countess of Chester, in 1135.   The Mappa Mundi describes it as Gilbertine, but modern authors regard it as Premonstratensian. Originally  suppressed in 1536,  Benedictine nuns from Stainfield were then moved in by the King. In 1537 the nunnery was refounded for Premonstratensian canonesses, before being finally suppressed in 1539.

In the Middle Ages, Lincolnshire was one of the most densely populated parts of England. Within the historical county there were no less than nine  Premonstratensian houses. Other than Stixwould Priory, these were: Barlings Abbey, Cammeringham Priory, Hagnaby Abbey, Newbo Abbey, Newsham Abbey, Orford Priory (women), Tupholme Abbey and West Ravendale Priory.

Part of the porter's lodge still remains and forms part of a modern farm-house, in the modern parish of Stixwould and Woodhall.

Priors of Stixwould
Hugh, occurs 1202 and 1205
Geoffrey, occurs 1227 and 1228
Gilbert of Eton, occurs 1308

Prioresses of Stixwould
Margaret Gobaud, elected 1274
Eva, died 1304
Isabel de Dugby, elected 1304, occurs 1317
Elizabeth, occurs 1327 and 1328
Elizabeth de Swylington, elected 1346
Isabel Mallet, died 1376
Eustace Ravenser, occurs 1393, died 1403
Katharine Roose,  elected 1403
Eleanor Welby,  occurs 1440
Helen Key,  before 1536
Mary Missenden,  last prioress, appointed 1537

References

Monasteries in Lincolnshire
1135 establishments in England
1536 disestablishments in England
1539 disestablishments in England
Cistercian nunneries in England